Pristimantis bromeliaceus is a species of frog in the family Strabomantidae.
It is found in Ecuador and Peru.
Its natural habitat is tropical moist montane forests.
It is threatened by habitat loss.

References

bromeliaceus
Amphibians of the Andes
Amphibians of Ecuador
Amphibians of Peru
Amphibians described in 1979
Taxonomy articles created by Polbot